The 2007 Pacific Games football tournament was an international football tournament held in Samoa from 25 August until 7 September 2007. The 10 national teams involved in the tournament were required to register a squad of players; only players in these squads were eligible to take part in the tournament.

Players marked (c) were named as captain for their national squad. Players' club teams and players' age as of 25 August 2007 – the tournament's opening day.

Group A

Cook Islands
Coach:  Tim Jerks

Fiji
Coach:  Juan Carlos Buzzetti

New Caledonia
Coach:  Didier Chambaron

Tahiti
Coach: Gérard Kautai

Tuvalu
Coach: Toakai Puapua

Group B

American Samoa
Coach:  David Brand

Samoa
Coach: Falevi Umutaua

Solomon Islands
Coach:  Ayrton Andrioli

Tonga
Coach:  Jacob Swanson

Vanuatu
Coach: Robert Calvo

References

Squads